Nyenrode Business Universiteit (abbreviated as NBU) is a Dutch business university and one of the five private universities in the Netherlands. Founded in 1946, it is located on a large estate in the town of Breukelen, between Amsterdam and Utrecht. The educational institution is named after the castle where the course is located: . Nyenrode was founded under the name of the Netherlands Training Institute for Abroad (NOIB in Dutch) by renowned private Dutch companies, including KLM, Shell, Unilever, Philips and AkzoNobel with an objective- 'For Business, By Business'. The establishment was the result of an idea from KLM director Albert Plesman.

Academics

The full-time and part-time MBA programs include a two-week module at Northwestern University's Kellogg School of Management near Chicago. In addition to Kellogg, Nyenrode has close connections with the University of Stellenbosch in South Africa, the Vlerick Leuven Gent Management School in Belgium, the University of St. Gallen in Switzerland & S. P. Jain Institute of Management and Research in Mumbai. Nyenrode was a cofounder of the China Europe International Business School. Nyenrode's international MBA program attracts students from all around the world. Nyenrode has a selection process that involves taking a Graduate Management Admissions Test, Business Game- A Case Study and a selection interview. Since every year there are a few international students, most teaching is in English.

Rankings
In the Financial Times Ranking for European Business Schools (2020), Nyenrode was given an overall position of 41st.
In the Financial Times Ranking for executive education programs (2020) Nyenrode achieved 27th place for open programmes and 76th for custom programmes (2014).
The Masters in Management MSc was given an overall position of 64th on the Financial Times Global Ranking for Masters in Management (2013).

Bachelor of Science in Business Administration Rankings:

Accreditation

Nyenrode Business University is fully accredited by
 Association of MBAs
EQUIS / EFMD
 EFMD
 Nederlands-Vlaamse Accreditatieorganisatie
Ministry of Education, Culture and Science (NVAO accreditation)
Accountancy Training Attainment Committee (CEA)

Alumni
Wim Kok, former Prime Minister of The Netherlands
Antony Burgmans, former chairman of Unilever
Peter Burggraaff, Director at Boston Consulting Group
Robert Polet, former chairman of Gucci
Hein Verbruggen, International Olympic Committee member
Jeroen Hoencamp, Chief Operating Officer VodafoneZiggo
Jan Kees de Jager, former Minister of Finance of the Netherlands
Dinesh Gunawardena, Minister of Urban Development and Sacred Area Development, Sri Lanka
Albert Heijn, executive in Albert Heijn supermarket chain
Tom van den Nieuwenhuijzen, member of the House of Representatives
Willem Oltmans, journalist
Oleksiy Pavlenko, Ukrainian Minister of Agrarian Policy and Food
Janwillem van de Wetering, author
Princess Viktória de Bourbon de Parme, businesswoman, lawyer, and member of the Dutch royal family

See also 
 List of business schools in Europe

References

External links 
 
 Nieuwe Compagnie van Verre (Student Association)
 Voortgezette Compagnie van Verre (Alumni Association)

 
Universities in the Netherlands
Business schools in the Netherlands
Educational institutions established in 1946
1946 establishments in the Netherlands
Education in Utrecht (province)
Stichtse Vecht